The 2003 Nigerian Senate election in Adamawa State was held on April 12, 2003, to elect members of the Nigerian Senate to represent Adamawa State. Iya Abubakar representing Adamawa North, Jibril Aminu representing Adamawa Central and Jonathan Zwingina representing Adamawa South all won on the platform of the Peoples Democratic Party.

Overview

Summary

Results

Adamawa North 
The election was won by Iya Abubakar of the Peoples Democratic Party.

Adamawa Central 
The election was won by Jibril Aminu of the Peoples Democratic Party.

Adamawa South 
The election was won by Jonathan Zwingina of the Peoples Democratic Party.

References 

April 2003 events in Nigeria
Adamawa State Senate elections
Ada